The following lists events in the year 2021 in South Korea.

Incumbents
President: Moon Jae-in (assumed office from May 10, 2017)
Prime Minister:
Chung Sye-kyun (until April 16th 2021)
Hong Nam-ki (until May 14th 2021)
Kim Boo-kyum (from May 14th 2021)

Events
 April 7 – 2021 South Korean by-elections.
 April 13  – South Korean government protested and regretted the Japanese cabinet decision to dump radioactive water of the Fukushima nuclear plant into the Pacific Ocean.
 December 24 – The South Korean government pardons former President Park Geun-hye due to deteriorating health, also exonerating the first female Prime Minister Han Myeong-sook.

Deaths
 January 5 – Kim Tschang-yeul, 91, South Korean painter.
 April 27 – Nicholas Cheong Jin-suk, 89, South Korean cardinal.

References

 
South Korea
South Korea
Years of the 21st century in South Korea
2020s in South Korea